The 1921 West Virginia Mountaineers football team was an American football team that represented West Virginia University as an independent during the 1921 college football season. In its first season under head coach Clarence Spears, the team compiled a 5–4–1 record and outscored opponents by a total of 158 to 82.

Schedule

References

West Virginia
West Virginia Mountaineers football seasons
West Virginia Mountaineers football